Crepis incana, the pink dandelion, is a species of flowering plant in the genus Crepis of the family Asteraceae, native to southern Greece. Superficially similar to the true dandelion (Taraxacum), it produces bright pink flower heads in late summer.

It has gained the Royal Horticultural Society's Award of Garden Merit.

References

incana
Flora of Greece
Plants described in 1813